There have been 58 Formula One drivers from the United States including two World Drivers' Championship winners, Mario Andretti and Phil Hill. Andretti is the most successful American Formula One driver having won 12 races, and only Eddie Cheever has started more Grands Prix. 

Another 56 American drivers competed in F1 races other than the Indy 500. , the most recent American race winner remains Mario Andretti, who won the 1978 Dutch Grand Prix.

Statistics
Statistics for the number of American drivers to have taken part in Formula One are convoluted by inclusion of the Indianapolis 500 in the 1950s. At the time the race was accepted as being part of the Formula One World Championship, even though very few teams or drivers from Europe participated at the event. Several American drivers only ever competed in that race and, if included in the overall statistics, it means that 233 drivers have been entered for a Formula One event since 1950. There have been only 19 American racers who contested 10 or more events.

The drivers' title has been won twice for the United States, with Phil Hill winning in 1961 and Mario Andretti being victorious in 1978. 

Andretti was the last American driver to win a race in Formula One – the 1978 Dutch Grand Prix. If every Formula One event is taken into consideration there have been 15 race winners, with five having won more than one race.

The most recent driver to have raced as an American is Logan Sargeant, who was signed to Williams Grand Prix Engineering.

Current driver
Logan Sargeant made his Formula One debut for Williams at the 2023 Bahrain Grand Prix.

Former drivers

Notable former drivers

Mario Andretti is the most successful Formula One driver to drive as an American, but he did not leave his native Italy until the age of 15. He raced in IndyCars from 1964 and, from 1968, spent time commuting to Europe to make appearances in Formula One races. Between his debut with Lotus at the 1968 Italian Grand Prix and the end of the 1974 season Andretti started 21 of the 84 races, driving for four teams. His first race with Ferrari brought about his first win – the 1971 South African Grand Prix. Andretti eventually decided to sign up as a full-time driver with Parnelli in 1975, but after a little over two seasons and no real success the team withdrew from Formula One. He signed with Lotus for the remainder of the season and, by the end of the year, was beginning to achieve some good results including a win at the 1976 Japanese Grand Prix. The car proved fast but unreliable for the following season, and Andretti's four wins took him up to third in the championship. With the problems solved for the following year he was able to win six races and the drivers' title. The decisive victory came at the 1978 Italian Grand Prix, but the race also saw the death of teammate Ronnie Peterson after a crash at the start. Andretti drove for three more seasons, but achieved only one more podium finish and was at best 12th in the championship. He retired from Formula One in 1981 but returned to Ferrari for the final two races of 1982 following an injury to Didier Pironi, some weeks after the death of Ferrari driver Gilles Villeneuve. Out of 128 F1 race starts Andretti finished on the podium 19 times, 12 of which were on the top step.

Phil Hill is the only American born Formula One champion. He won with Ferrari in 1961 after having had a season-long battle for top spot with teammate Wolfgang von Trips. Hill's win at the 1961 Italian Grand Prix secured the drivers' title for the American but, after passing the chequered flag and returning to the pits, he discovered that his close rival had died in an accident during the race. The collision between von Trips and Jim Clark's Lotus also killed 15 spectators – Hill's victory coincided with the worst tragedy in Formula One history. During his Formula One career Hill started 48 races and won just three events, the joint lowest of any world champion alongside Briton Mike Hawthorn.

Dan Gurney is highly regarded for his Formula One contributions both on and off track. He is the only driver to have scored the first victory for three constructors: Porsche (1962), Brabham (1964), and Eagle (1967). He himself had built the Eagle. Gurney's name is still associated with aerodynamics; he was the first person to use what is now known as a "Gurney flap" on the wing of his car. He is also credited as the first person to spray champagne on the podium. Gurney had made his debut with Ferrari in 1959, finishing in the top three in two of the four races he contested. His second season, now with BRM, was much less successful and his only race finish was in tenth position. Between 1961 and 1965 Gurney drove for three teams and was classified in the top six in the drivers' championship on each occasion, but he would never get higher than fourth in the title race. He left the sport in 1968 but made a brief return with McLaren after the death of founder Bruce McLaren. Gurney won four races out of the 86 he started.

Peter Revson started four races for Lotus in 1964, but returned to the US to drive in sports cars and Indy Cars. He made a guest appearance for Tyrrell at the 1971 United States Grand Prix and, though he did not finish the race, he impressed enough to be signed for McLaren for the following season. He stood on the podium at four of the nine races he attended, and stayed with the team for an even more successful year in 1973. Revson won the 1973 British Grand Prix and the 1973 Canadian Grand Prix, both in wet conditions, but chose to move to Shadow when McLaren offered him only a third car. While testing for the 1974 South African Grand Prix the front suspension of Revson's car failed, sending him into the barriers with fatal results.

Eddie Cheever had a brief spell in Formula One in 1978 before starting full-time drives in 1980 with Osella. The new team were unable to provide him with a decent car and he only finished in one of the races that year. He moved to Tyrrell for 1981 and things improved but he still missed out on podium finishes. With Ligier in 1982 he finished in the top three at three races before another change of team beckoned. Cheever enjoyed his most successful season with Renault in 1983, finishing on the podium four times. He was still unable to taste victory and, though his career would go on to the end of 1989, he was only ever able to finish at best third in two races. Cheever started more races than any other American driver. Throughout the 132 races he was never able to achieve a win, a pole position, or a fastest lap.

Richie Ginther started 52 races in the 1960s, finishing on the podium 14 times. He won the 1965 Mexican Grand Prix with Honda and came third overall in the 1963 season with BRM.

Bill Vukovich competed in five Indy 500 races when they were part of the Formula One World Championship. In 1951 he was forced to retire after just 29 laps and could only finish 17th the following year. He came back for the 1953 event, took pole position and then won the race. He won again in 1954 and was leading in 1955 when he crashed into a back marker. The collision pitched the car into and over a concrete wall, fracturing Vukovich's skull and killing him at the scene. Statistically Vukovich won 40% of the Formula One races in which he competed, but drivers who competed only at the Indy 500 events are often omitted from the history of the sport.

Other former drivers
Additional to those detailed above the following drivers started at least ten races:

See also
List of Formula One Grand Prix winners

References